Wolfgang von Polheim (1458–1512), Lord of Polheim zu Wartenburg, Puchheim and Waldenfels, was an Austrian nobleman who was a close and life-long friend and counsellor of the Holy Roman Emperor, Maximilian I. He was given senior positions in the Habsburg administration in Austria and was closely involved in Maximilian's diplomatic initiatives. In 1490, he represented Maximilian at his proxy wedding to Anne of Brittany at Rennes.

Polheim was a noted participant in jousts at tournaments, an enthusiasm he shared with Maximilian. He appears prominently, in a jousting context, in two works of art commissioned by Maximilian: the monumental woodcut, the Triumphal Procession, and in some of the miniature paintings of the Freydal tournament book.

Biography 
In the late Middle Ages, the von Polheims were one of the oldest and most prestigious aristocratic families of Upper Austria. Wolfgang von Polheim was born in 1458, the third son of Weikhard von Polheim, lord of Polheim and Wartenburg, and his wife Barbara von Traun. As children, he and Archduke Maximilian of Habsburg, the future Holy Roman Emperor Maximilian I, became companions and friends. Maximilian was the son and heir of the Emperor Frederick III. Frederick appointed Polheim to be councillor and chamberlain to Maximilian and he remained in Maximilian's service, and continued to be his close and trusted friend, for the rest of his life.

In 1477, Polheim accompanied Maximilian to the Low Countries for the latter's marriage at Ghent to Mary of Burgundy, heiress of Charles the Bold. For the next twelve years, Maximilian remained in the Low Countries trying to maintain his control over his wife's Burgundian inheritance in the face of French expansion and internal dissent. Polheim stayed with him. He campaigned with Maximilian to repulse Louis XI's attempts to seize the Burgundian territories but was taken prisoner by the French at the Battle of Guinegate in 1479. Maximilian complained about Polheim's treatment while he was a prisoner. In 1488, during one of the Flemish revolts against Maximilian, he and Polheim and several of Maximilian's other companions, were imprisoned at Bruges for 14 weeks.

After Mary's death, Maximilian arranged to marry Anne of Brittany and, in 1490, Polheim represented him at the proxy wedding ceremony in Rennes as Maximilian was not present in person. As part of the symbolism of the proxy wedding, on the wedding night Polheim went to bed with Anne but wore a full suit of armour apart from on his right leg and hand. A sword was placed between them in the bed. According to the 19th-century German historian Hans von Zwiedineck-Südenhorst, "the not entirely normal role he played in this made him well-known in all the countries of Christendom". In 1494, Polheim himself got married, to Johanna van Borsselen, daughter of Wolfert VI van Borsselen and heiress to the lordship of Fallais.

Maximilian returned to the Habsburg central European territories in 1489/1490, and succeeded to his father's Austrian and other domains on his death in 1493. Polheim continued to serve Maximilian and was closely involved in Maximilian's diplomatic activities. During a diplomatic mission to the French court, he met the later canonised friar Francis of Paola who had founded the Order of Minims, known in Germany as the Paulaner Order.

In 1500 he was rewarded for his service to Maximilian by being made a knight of the Order of the Golden Fleece. In 1501, he was also appointed Oberster Hauptmann (military commander) and Regent of Lower Austria. Maximilian made him an administrator of a number of imperial estates including at Frankenburg in Upper Austria where his harsh rule provoked a peasant revolt in 1511. Polheim died the following year in 1512. His tomb monument, by leading Salzburg Gothic sculptor Hans Valkenauer, is in the church he founded at Oberthalheim. His son, Cyriak (1495-1533), succeeded him as lord of Polheim zu Wartenburg and held important positions in the administrations of Maximilian's successor, the emperor Charles V and of Charles's brother, Ferdinand.

Jousting and Maximilian's Gedechtnus 

Maximilian was a life-long enthusiast of jousting and was himself a frequent participant in tournaments. Polheim shared his enthusiasm and a celebrated tournament was held at Polheim's wedding in Mechelen in 1494. Maximilian evidently admired Polheim's jousting skills and he played an important part in Maximilian's tournaments. A suit of armour belonging to Polheim, and made in Innsbruck around 1510, is on display at the Kunsthistorisches Museum in Vienna.

Polheim is known to have frequently jousted with Maximilian. One contemporary source identifies 15 occasions when Maximilian and Polheim jousted against each other. Many of these jousts were embellished with exuberant features. At a tournament in Ghent, they were described as jousting "in 'exploding' armour [and] painted horse armour". At another tournament, staged in the ducal menagerie in Brussels, Polheim jousted with a basket of eggs resting on his helmet and Maximilian wore a chained frog as a crest.

During his reign, Maximilian commissioned a number of humanist scholars and artists to assist him in completing a series of projects, in different art forms, intended to immortalize his life and deeds and those of his Habsburg ancestors. He referred to these projects as Gedechtnus ("memorial"). Jousting featured in some of these projects and, because of that, Polheim figured prominently in two of them: the Triumphal Procession and Freydal.

In the Triumphal Procession, a monumental series of woodcut prints depicting an imagined "royal entry", Polheim is given a role of particular importance. As a tournament Rennen und Gestech Meister he holds a banner which reads:

The Freydal tournament book, one of the principal components of the Freydal project, is a series of miniature paintings depicting scenes from 64 fictional tournaments. In the paintings, Maximilian, in the guise of the eponymous hero Freydal, jousts with contemporary figures, many of whom Maximilian did, in fact, joust with in real life. Of the 191 depictions of jousts,  Polheim features in 11 of them as Freydal's opponent. Only one other opponent features as many times as Polheim.

Notes

References

Bibliography 

 
 
 
 
 
 
 
 
 
 
 
 
 
 
 
 
 
 

1458 births
1512 deaths
Austrian nobility
Maximilian I, Holy Roman Emperor
Knights of the Golden Fleece